Electronic Attack Squadron 130 (VAQ-130), also known as the "Zappers", is an EA-18G Growler squadron of the United States Navy based aboard Naval Air Station Whidbey Island. Part of Carrier Air Wing 3, the Zappers deploy aboard the aircraft carrier . VAQ-130 is the oldest electronic warfare squadron in the U.S. Navy.

Squadron history

In 2017, Two naval aviators attached to VAQ-130 were disciplined for drawing a phallus in the sky over Okanogan County, Washington

VAW-13
The squadron was originally commissioned as Carrier Airborne Early Warning Squadron Thirteen (VAW-13) flying AD-5Qs in 1959.

During the Vietnam War detachments from VAW-13 were deployed on the following aircraft carriers operating on Yankee and Dixie Stations:
 
6 March-23 November 1965, Detachment, EA-1Fs were embarked on 
5 April-16 December 1965, Detachment, EA-1Fs were embarked on 
10 May-13 December 1965, Detachment, EA-1Fs were embarked on 
21 April 1965 – 13 January 1966, Detachment, EA-1Fs were embarked on 
12 May-3 December 1966, Detachmen,t EA-1Fs were embarked on 
21 June 1966 – 21 February 1967, Detachment 42, EA-1Fs were embarked on 
26 January-25 August 1967, Detachment 31, EA-1Fs were embarked on USS Bon Homme Richard
29 April-4 December 1967, Detachment, EA-1Fs were embarked on USS Constellation
16 June 1967 – 31 January 1968, Detachment, EA-1Fs were embarked on 
29 July 1967 – 6 April 1968, Detachment, EA-1Fs were embarked on 
4 November 1967 – 25 May 1968, Detachment 61, EKA-3Bs were embarked on 
18 November 1967 – 28 June 1968, Detachment 63, EKA-3Bs were embarked on 
3 January-18 July 1968, Detachment 65, EKA-3Bs were embarked on 
27 January-10 October 1968, Detachment 31, EKA-3Bs were embarked on USS Bon Homme Richard
10 April-16 December 1968, Detachment 66, EKA-3Bs were embarked on 
29 May 1968 – 21 January 1969, Detachment 64, EKA-3Bs were embarked on USS Constellation
18 July 1968 – 3 March 1969, Detachment 19, EKA-3Bs were embarked on 
7 September 1968 – 18 April 1969, Detachment 43, EKA-3Bs were embarked on USS Coral Sea

VAQ-130
On 1 October 1968, the squadron was re-designated Electronic Attack Squadron 130 and placed under Tactical Electronic Warfare Wing Thirteen (VAQW-13).

VAQ-130 detachments continued to deploy in support of the Vietnam War as follows:

26 October 1968 – 17 May 1969, Detachment 61, EKA-3Bs were embarked on USS Ranger
1 February-18 September 1969, Detachment 14, EKA-3Bs were embarked on 
18 March-29 October 1968, Detachment 31, EKA-3Bs were embarked on USS Bon Homme Richard
14 April-17 November 1969, Detachment 34, EKA-3Bs were embarked on USS Oriskany
2 April-12 November 1970, Detachment 31, EKA-3Bs were embarked on USS Bon Homme Richard
14 May-10 December 1970, Detachment 1, EKA-3Bs were embarked on USS Oriskany
16 April-6 November 1971, Detachment 2, EKA-3Bs were embarked on USS Midway
14 May-10 December 1971, Detachment 3, EKA-3Bs were embarked on USS Oriskany
11 June 1971 – 12 February 1972, Detachment 4, EKA-3Bs were embarked on USS Enterprise
1 October 1971 – 30 June 1972, Detachment 1, EKA-3Bs were embarked on USS Constellation
10 April 1972 – 3 March 1973, Detachment 2, EKA-3Bs were embarked on USS Midway
5 June 1972 – 30 March 1973, Detachment 3, EKA-3Bs were embarked on USS Oriskany
16 November 1973 – 23 June 1973, Detachment 4, EKA-3Bs were embarked on USS Ranger
18 October 1973 – 5 June 1974, Detachment 3, EKA-3Bs were embarked on USS Oriskany

In March 1975, the squadron relocated to their current homeport of Naval Air Station Whidbey Island and transitioned to the EA-6B Prowler.

In December 2010, the squadron returned from their last fleet deployment flying the EA-6B Prowler and began transition training in March 2011 to the EA-18G Growler; the Zappers completed transition training in November 2011.  The squadron deployed aboard  in July 2013 following a year-long work-up cycle.

See also

 History of the United States Navy
 List of United States Navy aircraft squadrons

References

External links
VAQ-130 official website

Electronic attack squadrons of the United States Navy
Military units and formations in Washington (state)